, founded in 1885, is the primary provider of natural gas to the main cities of Tokyo, Kanagawa, Saitama, Chiba, Ibaraki, Tochigi, Gunma, Yamanashi, and Nagano. , Tokyo Gas is the largest natural gas utility in Japan.

Timeline
October 1, 1885, Tokyo Gas was founded by Shibusawa Eiichi and Asano Sōichirō by acquiring business of Tokyo Prefecture Gas Bureau.
1912, Tokyo Gas merged with Chiyoda Gas. 
1913, Tokyo Gas merged with Kawasaki Gas. 
1944, Tokyo Gas acquired business of Yokohama City Gas Bureau.
May 2016, Tokyo Gas merged with Chiba Gas, Tsukuba Gakuen Gas Corporation, and Miho Gas.

External links 
Tokyo Gas website (Japanese)
Tokyo Gas website (English)

Japanese companies established in 1885
1912 mergers and acquisitions
1913 mergers and acquisitions
1944 mergers and acquisitions
2016 mergers and acquisitions
Companies listed on the Tokyo Stock Exchange
Companies listed on the Osaka Exchange
Energy companies based in Tokyo
Natural gas companies of Japan
Tokyo Gas Group